Raekwon Davis (born June 10, 1997) is an American football nose tackle for the Miami Dolphins of the National Football League (NFL). He played college football at Alabama.

College career
Davis started as a true freshman in 2016, and saw time in 7 games during his freshman season.  On August 27, 2017, Davis was shot in the right leg and hospitalized with a minor leg injury.  Less than a week Later on September 2, Davis played in the Alabama opening game against the Florida State Seminoles, and recorded a sack.  During his junior season, Davis received notoriety for punching Missouri Tigers lineman Kevin Pendleton during a game.  Despite speculation that he would declare for the 2019 NFL Draft, Davis announced that he would return to Alabama for his senior season.

Professional career

Davis was selected with the 56th pick in the 2020 NFL draft by the Miami Dolphins. He was placed on the reserve/COVID-19 list by the team on August 6, 2020, and activated two days later. He played all 16 games during his rookie season of 2020, finishing the year with 40 tackles.

On September 14, 2021, Davis was placed on injured reserve after suffering a knee injury in Week 1. He was activated on October 9, 2021.

References

External links

Alabama Crimson Tide bio
Miami Dolphins bio

1997 births
Living people
Players of American football from Mississippi
Sportspeople from Meridian, Mississippi
American football defensive tackles
American football defensive ends
Alabama Crimson Tide football players
Miami Dolphins players